Mostafa Waziri is the secretary-general of the Supreme Council of Antiquities of Egypt.

In March 2023, Waziri was part of the announcement of finding the North Facing Corridor (NFC) behind the original entrace, by the ScanPyramids team (Sébastien Procureur and Kunihiro Morishima et al).

References

External links
YouTube

Living people
Egyptian archaeologists
Year of birth missing (living people)
20th-century archaeologists
21st-century archaeologists